Dr. Dame Hilda Nora Lloyd, DBE (née Shufflebotham; 1891–1982) was a British physician and surgeon. She was the first woman to be elected (in 1949) as president of the Royal College of Obstetricians and Gynaecologists.

Born in Birmingham, the younger of two daughters, she attended King Edward VI High School, Edgbaston before entering Birmingham University (Interc BSc Pure Science, 1914, MBChB Medicine, 1916).

Personal life
In 1930 she married Arthur Lloyd, a pathologist who became professor of forensic medicine in Birmingham University two years later; they had no children.

Career
After house officer posts in London, she returned to Birmingham University as resident in obstetrics and gynaecology, passed her FRCS in 1920. She was particularly concerned with the problems of urban poor women, such as STDs and illegal abortions. The "flying squads" she pioneered helped to save the lives of mothers and babies who would otherwise have died. She became a lecturer in 1934, professor in 1944, and chair of Obstetrics and Gynaecology in 1946. 1950, she became the first woman on the General Medical Council. Although Christine Murrell had been elected to the GMC in 1933, Murrell never took seat due to her death on 18 October 1933.

References

External links

Encyclopedia.com
Oxford Dictionary of National Biography Index# 101061394

1891 births
1982 deaths
People educated at King Edward VI High School for Girls, Birmingham
British activists
British surgeons
Dames Commander of the Order of the British Empire
Date of birth unknown
Date of death unknown
British obstetricians
People from Birmingham, West Midlands
Alumni of the University of Birmingham
Academics of the University of Birmingham
20th-century surgeons